Hoogstraten VV (Dutch: Hoogstraten Voetbalvereniging) is a Belgian football club from Hoogstraten, Antwerp. It was founded in 1936 and has red and white team colors.

In 1964 Hoogstraten was promoted from the provincial leagues for the first time into the Belgian Promotion, followed by another promotion into the Belgian Third Division in 1986. The team stayed at the third level until 2002 when they dropped again to the fourth level. After promotions in 2008 and 2013, the team played at the highest level in its existence, the Belgian Second Division, from the 2013–14 season.

References

External links 
 Official website

Association football clubs established in 1936
1936 establishments in Belgium
Football clubs in Belgium
Hoogstraten
Sport in Antwerp Province